Welcome to Loserville is the only studio album from British pop punk band Son of Dork. The album was released on 21 November 2005 by Mercury Records. The album was later adapted into a musical, "Loserville the Musical", by band member James Bourne and writer Elliot Davis commissioned and performed by Youth Music Theatre UK and presented at the South Hill Park Arts Centre, Bracknell, in 2009. The show was subsequently retitled "Loserville" and produced professionally by Kevin Wallace, TC Beech and Youth Music Theatre UK at the West Yorkshire Playhouse. It then transferred to the West End's Garrick Theatre and featured UK pop star Chris Hardman.

The track "Boy Band" on the album was co-written by American band Wheatus. The album was certified Gold in the UK. A deluxe edition of the album was due for release on April 17, 2006. It was due to include six bonus tracks, as well as an additional DVD. The release of the album was later cancelled. The track "Welcome to Loserville" is hidden, and does not appear on the track listing. It can be accessed by rewinding into the pre-gap, prior to the first track, "Ticket Outta Loserville". The track cannot be accessed if the album is played in a computer.

Singles
 "Ticket Outta Loserville" - 7 November 2005 - entered at #3 on the UK Singles Chart.
 "Eddie's Song" - 16 January 2006 - entered at #10 on the UK Singles Chart.
 "We're Not Alone" - 10 April 2006 - due to be the lead single from the deluxe version of the album, however, both album and single were withdrawn. Theme from the movie Alien Autopsy starring TV duo Ant & Dec.

Track listing

Personnel
James Bourne - lead vocals, Rhythm guitarist
Steve Rushton - lead vocals, bassist
David Williams- Rhythm guitarist, backing vocals
Chris Leonard - Lead guitarist, backing vocals
Danny Hall - drummer

Additional personnel
Tom Fletcher - Guitar and vocals on track 2
Danny Jones - Guitar and vocals on track 2
Dougie Poynter - Bass and vocals on track 2
Harry Judd - Drums on track 2

Chart performance

References

2005 debut albums
Son of Dork albums
Albums produced by Gil Norton
Albums produced by the Matrix (production team)
Mercury Records albums
Concept albums